Area codes 778, 236, and 672 are telephone area codes in the North American Numbering Plan (NANP) for the entire Canadian province of British Columbia. They form an overlay complex with area code 604, which serves only a small southwestern section, the Lower Mainland, of the province (including Vancouver), and area code 250, which serves the rest of the province.

The area codes also serve the small United States community of Hyder, Alaska, which is located along the Canada–United States border near the town of Stewart.

Area code 257 has been proposed as an overlay for these area codes. The proposed relief date is April 26, 2025.

History
Area code 604 had served as British Columbia's sole area code for 53 years since the establishment of the North American Numbering Plan in 1947. In 1997, area code 250 was installed for Vancouver Island and the Interior, while area code 604 was restricted to serve Vancouver and the Lower Mainland. Intended as a long-term solution, the proliferation of telephone service in the area required additional central office code relief within only four years. While telephone numbers tended to be used up fairly quickly in the immediate Vancouver area due to its rapid growth, the number allocation problem was particularly severe in the Lower Mainland, which is home to most of the province's landlines and cell phones. Area code 778 was created on November 3, 2001, as a concentrated overlay for the two largest regional districts in the Lower Mainland, Metro Vancouver and the Fraser Valley Regional District. The rest of the Lower Mainland continued to use only 604. Nonetheless, the implementation of 778 made ten-digit dialing mandatory across the Lower Mainland.

In early 2007, the Canadian Radio-television and Telecommunications Commission (CRTC) faced the prospect that area code 250 would be exhausted in early 2008. Relief proposals included a geographic split that would have retained area code 250 for the interior of the province, with Vancouver Island switching to a new area code. An alternative was to expand area code 778 to the 250 numbering plan area, or concentrated overlays for a part of 250.  The CRTC concluded that there was not enough time to implement a split before exhaustion, and the major telecom providers in the territory contended that an overlay would be far easier to implement. Telus and other carriers wanted to spare their Vancouver Island customers the expense and burden of changing telephone numbers for a second time in a decade. Accordingly, the CRTC announced on June 7, 2007, that 778 would become an overlay for the entire province effective July 4, 2007. Overlays have become the preferred method of relief in Canada, and no area codes have been split in the country since 1999.

As of June 23, 2008, ten-digit dialling became mandatory across British Columbia; attempting to use only seven digits triggers an intercept message reminding callers of the rules. After September 12, 2008, seven-digit dialling ceased to function.

Within another four years, 604, 250, and 778 were close to exhaustion once again, requiring the addition of area code 236 for the province on June 1, 2013.

In 2019, area codes 604, 250, 778, and 236 were expected to reach certain exhaustion thresholds in May 2020. The CRTC ordered the introduction of a third overlay code for the province, 672, which was activated on May 4, 2019.

Communities and central office prefixes in the service area

100 Mile House (672) – 288 982
Abbotsford (672) – 371 588 994 998; (778) – 201 314 344 345 360 761 769 771 779 780 856 880 982
Aldergrove (672) – 890 980 985; (236) – 260; (778) – 240 241 242 243 245 246 255 369 549 551 552 556 808 809 823 825  878 908
Boston Bar (672) – 891
Bowen Island (672) – 892
Britannia Beach (672) – 893
Cache Creek (672) – 202; (778) – 207
Campbell River (778) – 346 420 560
Castlegar: (778) – 364 460 633
Chilliwack (778) – 539 596 860 933
Cobble Hill (672) – 365
Comox (778) – 431 541 585 992
Cortes Island (672) – 366
Courtenay (778) – 225 335 451 585 647
Cranbrook (672) – 987 988 989 990;(236) – 363; (778) – 261 450 517 520 550 570 761 963
Dawson Creek (778) – 273 299 595 843 864 964
Delta (778) – 264
Duncan (236) – 594; (778) – 422 455 493 568 936
Fernie (778) – 519
Fort Langley (672) – 885
Fort Nelson (778) – 463 553 744
Fulford Harbour (672) –  367 875
Ganges (672) – 368 874 984
Gitlaxt'aamiks (672) –  978
 Gold River (672) – 369
Gulf Islands (672) – 882
Haney (672) – 880
Holberg (672) –  217 873
Houston (778) – 221 642 816
Hudson's Hope (778) – 204
Invermere (778) – 526
Jordan River (672) – 218 872
Kamloops (236) – 421 425; (778) – 220 257 376 390 399 470 471 495 538 586 696 765
Kaslo (778) – 205
Kelowna (672) –  580 969 986 993; (236) – 338 361 420 457 492 499 588 595 633 763 766 795 822 970 974; (778) – 214 215 313 363 380 392 436 477 478 484 581 583 594 699 721 738 760 821 940 946
Kimberley (778) – 481
Kitimat (778) – 631 649 818 876
Kitwanga (672) – 644
Ladner (672) – 889
Langley (778) – 277 278 298 366 609 726 826
Lillooet (672) – 784
Maple Ridge (672)
Nakusp (778) – 206
Nanaimo (778) – 268 269 441 690 762 787 841 971
New Westminster (672) – 722; (778) – 237 238 312 384 385 386 387 388 389 396 397 398 503 688 727 759 772 773 775 789 791 792 801 822 827 858 859 861 862 863 865 869 885 889 891 892 893 895 896 898 907 935 937 979
North Kamloops (672) – 991
North Vancouver (672) – 333; (778) – 251 262 264 338 340 729 802 820
Ocean Falls (672) – 219 871
Pender Island (672) – 220
Penticton (236) – 422; (778) – 476 559 622 646 781 931
Pineview (672) – 577
Pitt Meadows (672) – 894
Port Alberni (778) – 419 421 449 925
Port Alice (672) – 786
Port Coquitlam (672) – 886; (778) – 216 284 285 325 730 831 941
Port Hardy (672) – 787
Port Moody (672) – 877; (778) – 217 272 355 522 731
Port Renfrew (672) – 788
Powell River (778) – 236 758
Prince George (672) – 983 996 997; (236) – 331 423; (778) – 281 349 415 416 497 510 675 693 763 764 890 983
Prince Rupert (778) – 361 645
Quesnel (236) – 424; (778) – 334 414 466 768 920
Red Rock (672) – 992
Richmond (672) – 772; (236) – 266; (778) – 219 234 282 295 296 297 723 732 803 804 832 918 919 960;
Radium Hot Springs (778) – 527
Saanich (672) – 883; (778) – 351 426 749 750
Sechelt (672) – 981
Smithers (778) – 210 640 648
Sooke (672) – 884; (778) – 352 425
South Delta (778) – 263
Sparwood (672) – 388 (778) – 518
Squamish (672) – 895 906
Surrey is divided into the following local rate centres:
Cloverdale (672) – 881; (778) – 571 574 575 850
Newton  (672) – 878; (236) – 263; (778) – 218 223 438 563 564 565 578 590 591 593 612 830 986
Whalley (672) – 876; (778) – 290 293 368 391 394 395 435 636 735 852
White Rock (672) – 896 (236) – 265; (778) – 291 292 294 390 545 736
Vanderhoof (672) – 645
Winter Harbour (672) – 790 868
Tahsis (672) – 789 869 979
Trail (778) – 274 367 456 965
Vancouver (672) – 202 222 444 513 514 515 666 887 888 999; (236) – 317 520 521 777 826 828 888 984 985 986 987 988 989 990 991 992 993 994 995 996 997 998 999; (778) – 200 222 224 227 228 229 230 231 232 233 235 239 288 300 302 309 316 317 318 319 320 321 322 323 327 328 329 330 331 333 370 371 372 373 374 375 377 378 379 381 383 446 452 504 532 554 558 580 588 600 628 668 680 681 682 683 684 686 689 706 707 708 710 712 713 714 724 737 782 783 785 786 788 800 807 819 828 829 833 834 835 836 837 838 839 840 845 846 847 848 849 854 855 857 866 867 868 870 871 872 873 874 875 877 879 881 882 883 886 887 888 889 891 893 897 899 903 904 905 923 926 927 928 929 938 939 944 945 952 953 954 955 956 968 980 984 985 987 988 989 990 991 992 993 994 995 996 997 998 999
Vernon (236) – 426; (778) – 212 475 506 790 930 932
Victoria (672) – 995; (236) – 237; (778) – 224 265 350 400 401 405 406 410 430 432 433 440 445 533 535 557 584 587 600 676 677 678 679 698 700 746 747 817 966 967 972 977
West Vancouver (672) – 777; (236) – 264; (778) – 279 280 734 805 851
Whonnock (672) – 897
Williams Lake (236) – 433; (778) – 267 333 412 417 567 799 961

See also
List of NANP area codes

Notes and references

External links
 CNA exchange list for area +1-236
 CNA exchange list for area +1-672
 CNA exchange list for area +1-778
 CNA NPA 250 Relief Planning
 Telecom archives
 Area Code Map of Canada

778
Communications in British Columbia
Telecommunications-related introductions in 2001
Telecommunications-related introductions in 2013
Telecommunications-related introductions in 2019